Ebony is a census-designated place (CDP) in Brunswick County, Virginia, United States. The population as of the 2010 Census was 161.

References
Virginia Trend Report 2: State and Complete Places (Sub-state 2010 Census Data)

Unincorporated communities in Virginia
Census-designated places in Brunswick County, Virginia
Census-designated places in Virginia